Urothoe is a genus of very small marine amphipod crustaceans in the family Urothoidae. Members of the genus are found worldwide.

Biology
They can swim for short distances. They are vulnerable to dredging but are able to recover afterwards and re-establish their burrows. They are deposit feeders and also selectively scrape microorganisms from grains of sand.

Reproduction
Urothoe reaches sexual maturity at five months and may live for about a year. The sexes are distinct and breeding takes place in the summer months. Fertilisation is internal and there are about fifteen eggs per brood, produced in a cycle of about fifteen days. Fecundity is high and the juveniles grow fast but biological dispersal is very limited.

Species
Urothoe contains the following species:

Urothoe atlantica Bellan-Santini & Menioui, 2004
Urothoe bairdii Bate, 1862
Urothoe brevicornis Bate, 1862
Urothoe carda Imbach, 1969
Urothoe chosani Hirayama, 1992
Urothoe convexa Kim & Kim, 1991
Urothoe corsica Bellan-Santini, 1965
Urothoe coxalis Griffiths, 1974
Urothoe cuspis Imbach, 1969
Urothoe dentata Schellenberg, 1925
Urothoe denticulata Gurjanova, 1951
Urothoe elegans (Bate, 1857)
Urothoe elizae Cooper & Fincham, 1974
Urothoe falcata Schellenberg, 1931
Urothoe femoralis K. H. Barnard, 1955
Urothoe gelasina Imbach, 1969
Urothoe grimaldii Chevreux, 1895
Urothoe hesperiae Conradi, Lopez-Gonzalez & Bellan-Santini, 1997
Urothoe intermedia Bellan-Santini & Ruffo, 1986
Urothoe irrostratus Dana, 1852
Urothoe latifrons Ren, 1991
Urothoe marina (Bate, 1857)
Urothoe marionis Bellan-Santini & Ledoyer, 1987
Urothoe oniscoides (K. H. Barnard, 1932)
Urothoe orientalis Gurjanova, 1938
Urothoe pestai Spandl, 1923
Urothoe pinnata K. H. Barnard, 1955
Urothoe platydactyla Rabindranath, 1971
Urothoe platypoda Griffiths, 1974
Urothoe poseidonis Reibish, 1905
Urothoe poucheti Chevreux, 1888
Urothoe pulchella (Costa, 1853)
Urothoe rotundifrons J. L. Barnard, 1962
Urothoe ruber Giles, 1888
Urothoe serrulidactylus K. H Barnard, 1955
Urothoe spinidigitata Walker, 1904
Urothoe tumorosa Griffiths, 1974
Urothoe varvarini Gurjanova, 1953
Urothoe vemae J.L. Barnard, 1962
Urothoe viswanathi Asari, 1998
Urothoe wellingtonensis Cooper, 1974

References

Gammaridea
Crustacean genera